Imo State Polytechnic is a higher education institute in Umuagwo, Imo State, Nigeria. It was established in 1978 as the Michael Okpara College of Agriculture, Umuagwo and was upgraded to a Polytechnic status, renamed as the Imo State Polytechnic, Umuagwo in 2007. The institution provides courses, training and research in all branches of Agriculture, Management Sciences, Engineering and Food Sciences.
The institution is certified to award National Diploma and Higher National Diploma qualifications.

The Polytechnic is twenty-six kilometers from Owerri on the Port Harcourt road and has three hundred and sixty hectares of land. The Otamiri River runs past its border, making it ideal for all year round agricultural production through irrigation.

Chinwe Obaji was a lecturer at this institution before being appointed head of the Nigerian Federal Ministry of Education.

See also
 List of polytechnics in Nigeria

References

External links 
 Official website

Polytechnics in Nigeria
Education in Imo State
Educational institutions established in 1978
1978 establishments in Nigeria